Jalpaiguri Zilla School was established in 1876 and is an educational institution of Jalpaiguri district of West Bengal. The landmark red brick main building is located on the bank of River Teesta.

Infrastructure
Jalpaiguri Zilla School has about 30 classrooms and six laboratories. Five of these are for physics, chemistry, biology, computer (Linux) and geography. The last is ATL Lab (Atal Bihari Vajpayee science lab). It is a sophisticated science laboratory, the first ATL lab made in Jalpaiguri district.

The school has two playgrounds. The larger is used for cricket, football, and athletics.

A mid-day meal is served to the students.

Awards and recognition

Jalpaiguri Zilla School became the champion on 16 February 2018, beating all government schools of West Bengal, at the 9th All Bengal Inter Government Schools' Sports Meet 2017–2018 in SAI complex, Salt Lake, Kolkata. This is an athletics championship. Jalpaiguri Zilla School finished with 8 gold medals, 1 silver and 2 bronzes.
Nilabja Das and Mrinmay Mandal secured a joint 3rd position in Madhyamik examination 2018, both  getting 687. Though after re assessment, Nilabja Das managed the 1st position in the state by scoring 689 marks.
Granthan Sengupta ranked 1st in the HS exam 2018, scoring 496 out of 500.
Kaushik Sikdar, the zoology teacher, won the Siksharatna award in 2018.
On January 30, 2019, Jalpaiguri Zilla School became the 1st runners up in the 10th All Bengal Inter Government Schools' Sports Meet, 2018–2019, in Salt Lake, Kolkata, with 4 golds, 6 silvers and 2 bronze medals.
 Ayushman Nandi became the champion in U-17 School Badminton Championships in October 2019. He took part in the national level, with becoming the leader of the West Bengal team.
 Soumyabrata Mukhopadhyay became one of the greatest child scientists of India on 31 December 2019 in 27th National Children's Science Congress 2019, in Tiruvananthapuram, ranking at the top 25 of the country.

Jalpaiguri Zilla School won the state level YPC (Youth Parliament Competition) on January 13, 2020, in Kolkata.
On February 2, 2020, Jalpaiguri Zilla School became the 1st runners up in the 11th All Bengal Inter Government Schools' Sports Meet, 2019–2020, in Murshidabad, with 4 golds, 5 silvers and 4 bronze medals.

Barunaditya Saha secured the 8th position in Madhyamik examination 2020, getting 685 marks.
In the HS exam 2020, four from this school ranked in merit list. They were Mrinmay Mandal(5th), Nilabja Das(7th), Debajit Roy(9th) and Agniva Sarkar(10th).
In the YPC 2022-23 competition, Jalpaiguri Zilla School became the 1st runners up. In the play, the school became 2nd. The only role that won an individual championship was the opposition leader, performed by Soumyabrata Mukhopadhyay. At the quiz, the team of Nababrata Roy and Rupankar Dhar emerged champion while at the character building, the team of Hrishiraj Sarkar and Ishan Chanda secured the 2nd place. Aryaprabha Chowdhury won the extempore and Sagar Das topped the essay writing competition. The competition was held on 2 September 2022 in the municipality level.
During the District Level Competition, (held on 25 September), Nababrata Roy and Rupankar Dhar again became the champion in the quiz, while the team of Hrishiraj Sarkar and Ishan Chanda secured the 3rd position.

 At the 1st Vidyasagar Olympiad Exam 2022, two from the school won the scholarship. Prantik Sengupta ranked 12th and Sinchan Maitra ranked 15th in the state.

 3 students namely Aryaprabha Chowdhury, Soumyabrata Mukhopadhyay and Prithvish Chakraborty from this school won the very prestigious JBNSTS Jr. Scholarship in 2022.

At the National Childrens' Science Congress 2022-23, Adhyayan Sarkar and Arjo Das participated at the National level in Ahmedabad, Gujrat.

 At the 12th All Bengal Inter-Govt. Schools' Sports Meet 2023, Jalpaiguri Zilla School finished with 2 silvers and 2 bronze medals.

Notable alumni
 
 
 Pradip Kumar Banerjee, Indian footballer and football manager
 Sukalyan Ghosh Dastidar, Indian footballer of the 1970s
 Samaresh Majumdar, Bengali novelist
 Debesh Roy, Bengali novelist

See also
Education in India
List of schools in India
Education in West Bengal

References

External links
 Jalpaiguri Zilla School

Schools in Colonial India
Education in Jalpaiguri
Educational institutions established in 1876
1876 establishments in India
Schools in Jalpaiguri district